The Hagerstown Suns Minor League Baseball team was established in Hagerstown, Maryland, in 1981.  The Suns remained in the Carolina League through 1988. In 1989, team ownership purchased the Williamsport Bills franchise of the Double-A Eastern League (EL) and relocated the team to Hagerstown. The Double-A Suns carried on the history of the Class A team that preceded it. After just four seasons, the Eastern League franchise  left. The Myrtle Beach Hurricanes franchise of the Class A South Atlantic League (SAL) relocated to Hagerstown for the 1993 season where they became the Suns and continued the previous Suns teams' history.

The Suns' lone league championship was won in their inaugural 1981 season.

Previous Hagerstown teams

Cumberland Valley League (1896) 
Professional baseball has been played in Hagerstown since the late nineteenth century. The Hagerstown Lions played for one season in the independent Cumberland Valley League during 1896. The league began on June 19 and lasted until August 9, when it disbanded due to the disbandment of one of the teams, the Chambersburg Maroons, on August 7. The Lions finished the season in first place with a record of 26–12, three games ahead of Chambersburg. The Lions also dominated statistically, having the league leaders in runs (40 by Natty Nattress), hits (52 by William Graffius), wins by a pitcher (10 by Thomas Lipp), and winning percentage by a pitcher (.833 by Thomas Lipp, with a 10–2 record). Lipp and another Lion, John Gochnaur, were the first Hagerstown players to make it to the major leagues.

Blue Ridge League / Middle Atlantic League (1915–1931) 

In 1915, the Class D Blue Ridge League was formed with its headquarters in Hagerstown. Hagerstown fielded a team for the next 16 seasons. Throughout this time, they won five pennants and donned four different names: the Blues, Terriers, Champs, and Hubs. Before the beginning of the 1931 season, the Blue Ridge League disbanded. The club was then affiliated with the Class C Middle Atlantic League, but on June 28, 1931, the club moved to Parkersburg, West Virginia. The Hagerstown players with the most major league experience during this era were Mike Mowrey (13 major league seasons), Frankie Pytlak (12 major league seasons), and Babe Phelps (11 major league seasons).

Interstate League / Piedmont League (1941–1955) 

Professional baseball returned to Hagerstown in 1941 when Oren E. Sterling moved his Sunbury Indians franchise to town and became a Detroit Tigers affiliate. The newly named Hagerstown Owls (Oren, Win, Luck, and Sterling) joined the Class B Interstate League. Gene Raney purchased the team from Sterling in 1950, and the renamed Hagerstown Braves became an affiliate of the Boston Braves.

The team moved to the Piedmont League in 1953 and once again had a name and affiliation change. The new Washington Senators affiliate, the Hagerstown Packets, competed until the league disbanded after the 1955 season.

Carolina League (1981–1988) 
Hagerstown was without a professional team until 1981 when Lou Eliopulos purchased the Rocky Mount Pines Class A Carolina League franchise and moved them north to Hagerstown.

Team highlights 
The team was a co-op affiliate during 1981, with coaches supplied by the Baltimore Orioles and players supplied by several major league clubs to include the Orioles, Chicago Cubs, Cleveland Indians, and Pittsburgh Pirates. The newly named Hagerstown Suns proceeded to win the Carolina League championship in their inaugural season by defeating the Peninsula Pilots. 
  
In 1982, the Suns began a long-term affiliation with the Baltimore Orioles. The 1982 Suns had a better record than the 1981 team, but did not reach the playoffs. For 1983, despite winning 84 games, the Suns finished 10.5 games behind the North Division champion Lynchburg Mets. The winner of the South Division was the Winston-Salem Red Sox, who won 10 games less than the Suns. Hagerstown also led the Carolina League in attendance during 1983 with 153,660 fans as compared to Durham's 142,370.

They experienced their first losing season in franchise history in 1984, finishing 30 games behind the first place Lynchburg Mets. One reason may have been the fact the team had three different managers (John Hart, Len Johnston, and Grady Little) during the season. In 1985, the Suns played an exhibition game with the parent club Baltimore Orioles.

The Suns' best overall record in franchise history and a return to the Carolina League championship series came in 1986. However, the Suns would lose the league championship to the Winston-Salem Spirits. The Suns would also make the playoffs in 1987, only to be eliminated in the first round by the eventual league champion Salem Buccaneers.

Despite having the best overall record in the Carolina League North Division in 1988, the Suns did not make the playoffs. This occurred because the Suns did not win either the first or second half. The team that won the North Division championship was the Lynchburg Red Sox, whose overall record was 11 games worse than the Suns.

Carolina League records 

The Suns still hold several Carolina League single-game individual and team records.
 Doubles: Dan Norman, 4 (May 14, 1986) shared with nine others
 Triples: Johnny Tutt, 3 (July 29, 1982) shared with three others
 Grand slams: Dave Falcone, 2 (June 9, 1986) shared with two others
 Runs batted in: Dave Falcone, 11 (June 9, 1986)
 Stolen bases: Johnny Tutt, 5 (August 14, 1982) shared with three others
 Most assists by a shortstop: Randy Strajek, 12 (June 16, 1988) shared with two others
 Most double plays, both teams, extra innings: 10 (August 15, 1986) 5 for Hagerstown and 5 for Kinston in 11 innings
 Most team assists, one game (nine innings): 24 (June 16, 1988) shared with one other team

Other individual highlights 

In addition to the Carolina League records, the Suns also had many other individual distinctions during the Carolina League period. Matt Tyner and Ken Gerhart set the club record for season home runs with 31 in 1981 and 1983 respectively. Also in 1983, future Hall of Fame member Jim Palmer made a rehabilitation start for Hagerstown.
    
Craig Worthington and Pete Stanicek were the standouts in 1986. Worthington set a Suns record with 105 runs batted in (RBIs) and hit 15 home runs. He did this while maintaining a .300 batting average. Meanwhile, Stanicek batted .317 and set a Suns' record (later tied by Don Buford in 1988) by stealing 77 bases, only getting caught 17 times. One other noteworthy player for Suns' fans in 1986 was Mick Billmeyer, a local product from nearby Funkstown. He played the entire 1986 season as the primary back-up to Suns catcher Jeff Tackett.

The 1987 offense was led by Leo Gómez. He batted a league leading .326 with 19 home runs and 110 RBI. Gomez also led the Carolina League in doubles with 38. The ace of the Suns' rotation in 1987 was Blaine Beatty. Beatty went 11–1 with a 2.52 earned run average (ERA) in 13 starts with the Suns before being promoted to Double-A Charlotte. He completed 4 of his starts and allowed just 81 hits in 100 innings. Beatty was also named the 1987 Carolina League Pitcher of the Year.

Carolina League All-Stars and season leaders

Eastern League (1989–1992) 

In 1989, Hagerstown moved up to the Double-A Eastern League, taking over the Williamsport Bills franchise and again affiliating with the Orioles. (The Carolina League franchise relocated down Interstate 70 as the Frederick Keys, maintaining the Orioles' Class A affiliation.) Suns' fans saw some familiar faces as past players such as Leo Gómez, Pete Stanicek, Dave Bettendorf, Ken Dixon, and Brian Dubois returned. On offense, David Segui batted .324 with 1 homerun and 27 RBI in 44 games in his second stint with Hagerstown after being promoted from Frederick. Leo Gómez hit 18 home runs, a team leading total. Suns fans also saw the return of Steve Finley, who came back to Hagerstown via a rehabilitation assignment. In 11 games, Finley hit .417 with 7 RBI and 4 stolen bases. On the pitching side, Mike Linskey was the ace of the starting staff with 10 wins and a 2.81 ERA in 18 starts. Despite his dominance with the Suns, Linskey would never pitch in the major leagues. The Suns finished their first season in Double-A 5 games under .500, and ended up fifth in the then eight team Eastern League. They narrowly missed the playoffs by 3 games and were 24.5 games back of the first place, and eventual league champion, Albany-Colonie Yankees.

 
The Suns failed to make the Eastern League playoffs in 1990. While they fell short of that quest, the Suns still had one of their more interesting years. Jack Voigt would contribute mightily to the offense as he batted .256 with a team leading 12 homeruns and 70 RBI. Scott Meadows led the team with 75 RBI. Luis Mercedes batted a league leading .334. He also stole a team leading 38 bases. Three prominent Baltimore Orioles, Sam Horn, Brady Anderson, and Mike Devereaux, made rehabilitation appearances. Anderson stood out the most among the group as he hit .382 in 9 games. The pitching staff was led by Anthony Telford, who went 10–2 with a 1.97 ERA in 13 starts for the Suns, completing 4 games. Another milestone in 1990 was the visit of George H. W. Bush to Municipal Stadium to attend a Hagerstown Suns baseball game. This visit was the first time a sitting President of the United States attended a minor league baseball game.

After back to back losing seasons, the Suns returned to their winning ways in 1991, making their only Eastern League playoff appearance. They finished in second place, only to lose to the eventual league champion Albany-Colonie Yankees in the first round. The offense got power from Paul Carey, who hit a team leading 12 home runs. The Sun's best all around hitter may have been first basemen Ken Shamberg, who hit .275 with 10 homeruns and a team best 82 RBI in 114 games. Top prospect Arthur Rhodes led the pitching staff.  Over the course of 19 starts, Rhodes would go 7–4 with a 2.70 ERA and strikeout 115 batters in 106.2 innings, while walking just 47. Rhodes also won the Eastern League Pitcher of the Year Award. He also made his major league debut with the Orioles after being promoted directly from Hagerstown. Stacy Burdick was the leader in pitching wins (11), yet it was the last professional season that he pitched. Burdick went 29–17 combined between 3 stints with Hagerstown including time with the Carolina League franchise as well. Todd Stephen led the team in saves out of the bullpen with 17 and had a 2.12 ERA in 89 innings pitched. Much like the year before, Suns fans saw multiple rehabilitation assignments pass through as Kevin Hickey, Dave Johnson, Bob Milacki, Billy Ripken, and Glenn Davis each had stops in Hagerstown. All of this added to what was by far the Suns best season in the Double-A Eastern League. The Suns also had their all-time highest attendance record, with 193,753 fans passing through the gate.

The team fell short of its quest for the Eastern League playoffs in 1992. Mel Wearing led the team with only 5 homeruns. Scott Meadows would hit .317 in 45 games with the Suns; this proved to be his final year with the Orioles organization. Manny Alexander, the Suns' shortstop, hit .259 and stole a team-leading 43 bases. He did this at the age of 21, young for Double-A baseball. The 1992 season would also complete a unique trifecta for the Suns. In this season, Don Buford managed his son Damon. His other son, Don Jr., had played for the Suns in 1988 and 1989. Don Jr. tied the Suns record for stolen bases by a Suns with 77 in 1988 and would come back in 1989 to steal 30 more. Damon meanwhile, stole 41 bases in 1992 with the Suns. Damon was the only one of the two sons to follow in his father's footsteps by playing in the major leagues.

The Suns' and Keys' owners failed to claim an Eastern League expansion franchise for Bowie in 1993 (coinciding with the Florida Marlins' and Colorado Rockies' addition to the majors). They instead chose to move their existing Hagerstown franchise there as the Bowie Baysox. Hagerstown's relationship with the Baltimore Orioles ended after 1992. Unlike when the Carolina League team had left a few years earlier, there was no guarantee that another team would return to Hagerstown.

Hagerstown would not go without, though. Winston Blenckstone relocated his Myrtle Beach Hurricanes franchise in the Class A South Atlantic League (SAL) to Hagerstown after the 1992 season and promptly renamed them the Suns.

Eastern League All-Stars and season leaders

Major League Baseball (MLB) Players who played for the Carolina League and Eastern League Hagerstown Suns
Note:  MLB players who played for the South Atlantic League Hagerstown Suns can be found at Hagerstown Suns

All-time individual season records
Note:  For Single-A Hagerstown Suns individual season records, see Hagerstown Suns.

All-time team career leaders

Note:  These records cover all Hagerstown Suns teams from 1981 to 2019.

Suns team records
Note:  These records cover all Hagerstown Suns teams from 1981 to 2019.

Hagerstown Suns Carolina League and Eastern League Season-by-Season Record

Further reading
Johnson, Lloyd and Wolff, Miles, editors: Encyclopedia of Minor League Baseball. Durham, North Carolina Publisher: Baseball America, 2007. Format: Hardback, 767 pp. 
Savitt, Robert B.  The Blue Ridge League: Images of Baseball Publisher: Arcadia Publishing, 2011. Format: Softcover, 127pp. Language: English.

References

External links
 Statistics from Baseball-Reference

Hagerstown Suns